RTV Euro AGD is a trading name of a Polish company Euro-net sp. z o.o. In Poland, the company is commonly referred to as 'EURO'.

History
The company started selling consumer electronics and home appliances  in 1991, initially operating in Warsaw and vicinity. Currently, Euro-net has 277 shops in 177 cities all around Poland. The shops are usually located in biggest shopping centers. The company is also selling on the web and by telephone.

Its biggest competitor in Poland is Media Markt. Euro-net is the 9th biggest privately held company in Poland with yearly sales of 4.5 bln PLN (1.1 bln USD) in 2015. Total value of the consumer electronics and home appliances market in Poland in 2015 was 23.2 bln PLN.

Euro-net was fined over 0.5 mln PLN in 2013 by a national consumer watchdog UOKiK for deceitful advertising 

Euro-net should not be confused with Euronet Worldwide, which is a popular network of ATMs in Poland.

See also
Economy of Poland
List of Polish companies

References

External links

RTV Euro AGD
Sieć Euro się rozbudowuje i rozwija e-sklep
RTV Euro AGD otworzy swoje sklepy w świąteczną niedzielę?

Retail companies of Poland
Companies based in Warsaw
Polish brands
Retail companies established in 1991
1991 establishments in Poland